Eupithecia illaborata is a moth in the family Geometridae. It is found in Turkmenistan.

References

Moths described in 1903
illaborata
Moths of Asia